State Highway 35 (SH 35) is a New Zealand state highway on the East Coast of the North Island. It is the main highway that services the East Cape of New Zealand as well as many other rural towns such as Hicks Bay, Ruatoria, Tolaga Bay, and the city of Gisborne.

It is part of the Pacific Coast Highway.

Route description
The road then begins its long route around the coast. After 157 km and at Te Araroa near Hicks Bay the road turns sharply right, although straight traffic may continue on to reach the East Cape. SH 35 continues on, past Ruatoria and then Tolaga Bay, home to New Zealand's longest wharf. 8 km near the end of its route, SH 35 crosses the Turanganui River bridge and reaches Gisborne. SH 35 turns left onto Customhouse Street and then right onto Awapuni Road, the last stretch of road, before meeting back at SH 2 where it terminates.

History
There have been two notable changes to SH 35. It used to run through Wainui Beach before the construction of the bypass in 1990, and it used to run along Gladstone Road, Gisborne's main street. Since 1997, SH 35 now travels along Customhouse Street and Awapuni Road, diverting heavy traffic from the city centre.

See also
 List of New Zealand state highways

References

External links
New Zealand Transport Agency

35
Transport in the Gisborne District
Transport in the Bay of Plenty Region